The 1991 Atlantic 10 men's basketball tournament was played from March 2 to March 4, 1991, and March 7, 1991, at the Palestra in Philadelphia, Pennsylvania, except for the final that was played at Rec Hall in University Park, Pennsylvania.  The winner was named champion of the Atlantic 10 Conference and received an automatic bid to the 1991 NCAA Men's Division I Basketball Tournament. Penn State University won the tournament. Temple and Rutgers also received bids to the NCAA Tournament. Freddie Barnes of Penn State was named the tournament's Most Outstanding Player.  The top six teams in the conference received first-round byes.

Bracket

* - Overtime

References

Atlantic 10 men's basketball tournament
Tournament
Atlantic 10 men's basketball tournament
Atlantic 10 men's basketball tournament